Márcio Gesteira da Silva also known as Márcio Carioca (born May 2, 1983 in Rio de Janeiro, Brazil) is a Brazilian football player.

His strength on the ball, accurate finishing and pace made him a well known name in the northern states of Brazil. He enjoyed success at Brazilian side Ceara, before moving to Portuguese side Paços de Ferreira on a two-year deal. On February 1, 2008 he was released by the club.

In 2008, he trialled with Australian A-League club Queensland Roar but was rejected for failing to impress in trial matches and also due to his lack of fitness.

Honours
With Boca Júnior:
 Campeonato Sergipano 2nd Division: 2004
Personal Honours:
 Campeonato Sergipano 2nd Division Top Scorer: 2004 with Boca Júnior - 5 goals
 Campeonato Sergipano Top Scorer: 2005 with Boca Júnior - 15 goals

References

Footballers from Rio de Janeiro (city)
Brazilian footballers
1983 births
Living people
Brazilian expatriate footballers
Association football forwards
Expatriate footballers in Portugal
Expatriate footballers in Yemen
Primeira Liga players
Campeonato Brasileiro Série D players
Associação Olímpica de Itabaiana players
Ceará Sporting Club players
F.C. Paços de Ferreira players
Guarany Sporting Club players
Mesquita Futebol Clube players
Treze Futebol Clube players
Resende Futebol Clube players